{{Automatic Taxobox
| fossil_range = 
| image = Opiliones, Cyphophthalmi, Sironidae, Siro (2404167613).jpg
| image_caption = Siro" sp.
| display_parents = 2
| taxon = Sironidae
| authority = Simon, 1879
| diversity_link = 
| diversity = 8 genera, > 30 species
| range_map = distribution.sironidae.1.png
| subdivision_ranks = Genera
| subdivision = 
| synonyms = Sironides
}}

The Sironidae are a family of harvestmen with more than 30 described species.

The family shows a Laurasian distribution, with most species found in temperate Europe and the west coast of North America. The only exception is Suzukielus sauteri from Japan.

NameSiro is the Latinized form of the French name "Ciron".

Species

 Cyphophthalmus (mostly Balkan)
 Cyphophtalmus duricorius Joseph, 1868 (Austria, Croatia, Slovenia, Bosnia-Herzegovina, Italy)
 Cyphophtalmus duricorius bithynicus (Gruber, 1973) (Turkey: Bursa)
 Cyphophtalmus duricorius bolei (Hadzi, 1973) (Montenegro)
 Cyphophtalmus duricorius corfuanus (Kratochvíl, 1937) (Greece: Corfu)
 Cyphophtalmus duricorius yalovensis (Gruber, 1973) (Turkey: Yalova)
 Cyphophtalmus eratoae Juberthie, 1968 (Greece)
 Cyphophthalmus ere Karaman, 2007 (Serbia)
 Cyphophthalmus gjorgjevici (Hadzi, 1933) (North Macedonia)
 Cyphophthalmus klisurae (Hadzi, 1973) (cave near Klisura, Serbia)
 Cyphophthalmus markoi Karaman, 2007 (North Macedonia)
 Cyphophthalmus minutus Kratochvíl, 1937 (Croatia, cave)
 Cyphophthalmus montenegrinus Hadzi, 1973 (Montenegro)
 Cyphophthalmus noctiphilus Kratochvíl, 1940 (Croatia: cave Vranjaca)
 Cyphophthalmus nonveilleri Karaman, 2007 (Serbia, cave)
 Cyphophthalmus ohridanus Hadzi, 1973 (North Macedonia, cave)
 Cyphophthalmus serbicus Hadzi, 1973 (karstic region of east and central Serbia)
 Cyphophthalmus silhavyi Kratochvíl, 1937 (Croatia, cave)
 Cyphophthalmus teyrovskyi Kratochvíl, 1937 (Croatia, cave)

 Iberosiro (Portugal, cave)
 Iberosiro distylos de Bivort, 2004

 Odontosiro Juberthie, 1961 (Portugal, Spain)
 Odontosiro lusitanicus Juberthie, 1961

 Paramiopsalis Juberthie, 1962 (Portugal, Spain)
 Paramiopsalis ramulosus Juberthie, 1962

 Parasiro Hansen & Sørensen, 1904
 Parasiro coiffaiti Juberthie, 1956 (Spain, France)
 Parasiro corsicus (Simon, 1872) (Corsica)
 Parasiro minor Juberthie, 1958 (Italy, Corsica)

 Siro Latreille, 1796 (western Europe, North America)
 Siro acaroides (Ewing, 1923) (US west coast: Washington, Oregon, California)
†Siro balticus Dunlop & Mitov, 2011 (fossil, Baltic amber, unknown locality)
 Siro beschkovi Mitov, 1994 (Bulgaria)
 Siro boyerae Giribet & Shear, 2010 (Washington, Oregon)
 Siro calaveras Giribet & Shear, 2010 (California)
 Siro carpaticus Rafalski, 1956 (Poland, Slovakia)
 Siro crassus Novak & Giribet, 2006 (Slovenia)
 Siro exilis Hoffman, 1963 (US east coast: Virginia, West Virginia, Maryland)
 Siro kamiakensis (Newell, 1943) (Washington, Idaho)
 †Siro platypedibus Dunlop & Giribet, 2003 (fossil, Bitterfield amber from Bitterfeld, Germany)
 Siro rubens Latreille, 1804 (France)
 Siro shasta Giribet & Shear, 2010 (California)
 Siro sonoma Shear, 1980 (Northern California)
 Siro valleorum Chemini, 1990 (Italy)

 Suzukielus Juberthie, 1970 (Japan)
 Suzukielus sauteri (Roewer, 1916)

 Tranteeva (Bulgaria)
 Tranteeva paradoxa Kratochvíl, 1958

The following genus is no longer included in Sironidae, but also not yet included in any new family:

 Marwe Shear, 1985 (Kenya)
 Marwe coarctata Shear, 1985

Footnotes

References
 Joel Hallan's Biology Catalog: Sironidae
 Checklist of the Cyphophthalmi species of the World
  (eds.) (2007): Harvestmen - The Biology of Opiliones. Harvard University Press 

Further reading
  (2005): The genus Cyphophthalmus (Arachnida, Opiliones, Cyphophthalmi) in Europe: A phylogenetic approach to Balkan Peninsula biogeography. Molecular Phylogenetics and Evolution'' 36(3): 554-567. 

Harvestmen
Harvestman families